is a former Japanese footballer who last played for SC Sagamihara.

Club statistics
Updated to 23 February 2017.

References

External links

Profile at SC Sagamihara

1988 births
Living people
Kanto Gakuin University alumni
Association football people from Kanagawa Prefecture
People from Hiratsuka, Kanagawa
Japanese footballers
J3 League players
Japan Football League players
SC Sagamihara players
Association football goalkeepers